Little Miss Sunshine may mean:
 Little Miss Sunshine, a 2006 black comedy road film.
 Little Miss Sunshine (musical), the 2006 musical of the film
 Little Miss Sunshine (soundtrack), the soundtrack
 Little Miss Sunshine (character), a character in the Mr. Men children's books
 Little Miss Sunshine and the Wicked Witch, a series "special"

See also
 Little Miss Sunbeam, mascot of Sunbeam Bread
 Miss Sunshine (song) (2011), by German dance-band R.I.O.